Qarxun or Karkhun may refer to:
Karkhun, Armenia
Qarxun, Nakhchivan, Azerbaijan
Qarxun, Quba, Azerbaijan
Aşağı Qarxun, Azerbaijan
Yuxarı Qarxun, Azerbaijan